The 2000 Major League Baseball All-Star Game was the 71st playing of the midsummer classic between the all-stars of the American League (AL) and National League (NL), the two leagues comprising Major League Baseball. The game was held on July 11, 2000 at Turner Field in Atlanta, Georgia, home of the Atlanta Braves of the National League. 

The Florida Marlins were originally awarded the 2000 All-Star Game in July 1995, but due to concerns over the chronically low attendance figures at Pro Player Stadium and the long-term viability of the South Florida market, National League president Len Coleman revoked the game from Miami in December 1998. The Marlins finally got to host the All-Star Game for the first time, 17 years later.

Coleman announced Atlanta would be the replacement host of the game, giving the Braves the chance to host their first All-Star Game since 1972. Turner Field, which opened in 1997 played a factor in Coleman's decision to award the game to Atlanta, citing Major League Baseball's desire to have the All-Star Game played in newer venues as a way to showcase the ballparks.

The 2000 All-Star Game was one of the few occurrences in which the manager of the host team also managed the home team of the game, in this case, the National League (Bobby Cox had led the Braves to the World Series the previous year earning the right to manage the National League).

The result of the game was the American League defeating the National League by a score of 6–3. The game is remembered for Chipper Jones' home run off James Baldwin. This was also the last MLB All-Star Game that was broadcast on NBC. Brandy sang "The Star-Spangled Banner", while Canadian singer Chantal Kreviazuk sang "O Canada".

Rosters
Players in italics have since been inducted into the National Baseball Hall of Fame.

American League

Baltimore Orioles 3B Cal Ripken Jr. was selected to start by the fans but unable to play due to injury.
Seattle Mariners SS Alex Rodriguez was selected to start by the fans but unable to play due to a head injury.
Cleveland Indians RF Manny Ramírez was selected to start by the fans but unable to play due to injury.

National League

 New York Mets C Mike Piazza was selected to start by the fans but unable to play due to injury.
 St. Louis Cardinals 1B Mark McGwire was selected to start by the fans but unable to play due to injury.
 San Francisco Giants LF Barry Bonds was selected to start by the fans but unable to play due to a thumb injury.
 Cincinnati Reds CF Ken Griffey, Jr. was selected to start by the fans but unable to play due to injury, but did participate in the home run derby. He did not attend the All-Star Game.

Game

Umpires

Starting lineups

Game summary

Home Run Derby

Footnotes and references

External links
All-Star Game site
Lineups, boxscore, and more

Major League Baseball All-Star Game
Major League Baseball All-Star Game
Baseball competitions in Atlanta
July 2000 sports events in the United States
Major League Baseball All Star Game
2000 in Atlanta